The Saltwater River Rail Bridge is a large steel arch truss railway bridge completed in 1858 and crossing the Maribyrnong River (formerly Saltwater River) on the Melbourne to Footscray railway in Melbourne, Victoria. It had the longest span of any bridge in Victoria for thirty years.

Construction
Construction of the Bendigo and Williamstown railways by the Melbourne, Mount Alexander and Murray River Railway Company was commenced under a private joint stock company in 1854. However, difficulties in raising finance led to its takeover by the Victorian Colonial government in 1856, and the establishment of the Victorian Railways Department to build and operate the main line railways. The chief engineer of the line's construction, George Christian Darbyshire, reported in November 1856, that drawings and specifications for the wrought iron bridge over the Saltwater River had been sent to England on 25 June 1856, and that the drawings and specifications for the masonry of the bridge were also well advanced. The bluestone abutments were designed by William Bryson.

The specification for the wrought iron tubular box girder bridge to a design developed and fabricated by William Fairbairn & Sons of Manchester were:
" ...one span of two hundred feet in the clear between the piers, and to consist of three wrought iron tubular girders, each of two hundred feet clear span, supported upon two stone piers twenty-one feet six inches above high water level. Each girder is to have eight feet bearing each end upon the piers, making the total length of each girder two hundred and sixteen feet. The girders are to be placed parallel to each other, and fifteen feet nine inches apart. The roadway is to be carried upon longitudinal sleepers resting upon, and bolted to the angleirons of the cross bearers. The cross bearers are to be of wrought iron, in one length, reaching from outside to outside girder, and riveted to the bottoms of the outside girders, and riveted and bolted also to the centre girder."

The bridge was completed in December 1858 and load tested on 7 January 1859, six days before the official line opening, with two engines each hauling six wagons loaded with iron rail chairs.

Replacement spans
In 1911, in order to carry the heavier locomotives coming into service, and following the installation of temporary timber props to strengthen the bridge, the spans were replaced with two mild steel through hog-back Pratt trusses, fabricated by Mephan Ferguson. So that trains could continue to operate over the bridge during the works, the replacement was done by erecting the new trusses inside the existing girders and then removing the latter. The new structure was completed on 31 October 1914.

Duplication
A new steel plate girder bridge of two spans was erected on the upstream side in 1974 to carry the tracks of the St Albans line and another two span bridge erected downstream for the Regional Fast Rail project in 2012.

References 

Bridges in Melbourne
Heritage sites in Melbourne
Bridges completed in 1858
1856 establishments in Australia
Railway bridges in Victoria (Australia)
Buildings and structures in the City of Maribyrnong
Transport in the City of Maribyrnong
Transport in the City of Melbourne (LGA)
Buildings and structures in the City of Melbourne (LGA)
Maribyrnong River